(stylized as BLUELOCK) is a Japanese manga series written by Muneyuki Kaneshiro and illustrated by Yusuke Nomura. It has been serialized in Kodansha's Weekly Shōnen Magazine since August 2018, with its chapters collected in 23 tankōbon volumes as of March 2023.

An anime television series adaptation produced by Eight Bit premiered in October 2022.

By March 2023, the manga had over 24 million copies in circulation, making it one of the best-selling manga series. In 2021, Blue Lock won the 45th Kodansha Manga Award in the shōnen category.

Plot
In 2018, the Japanese national team finished 16th in the FIFA World Cup. As a result, the Japan Football Association hires the football enigma Ego Jinpachi. His master plan to lead Japan to stardom is Blue Lock, a training regimen designed to create the world's greatest egotist striker. Those who fail Blue Lock will never again be permitted to represent any Japanese team. Yoichi Isagi, an unknown high school football player who is conflicted about his playing style, decides to join the program in order to become the best egotistical striker in the world.

Characters

Media

Manga
Blue Lock is written by Muneyuki Kaneshiro and illustrated by Yusuke Nomura. The series began in Kodansha's Weekly Shōnen Magazine on August 1, 2018. Kodansha has collected its chapters into individual tankōbon volumes. The first volume was released on November 16, 2018. As of March 16, 2023, twenty-three volumes have been released. 

In January 2021, Kodansha USA announced that they have licensed the manga for English digital release in North America, starting on March 16, 2021. In January 2022, Kodansha USA announced that they will release the manga in print.

The manga has also been licensed in France by Pika Édition; in Germany by Kazé; in Taiwan by Tong Li Publishing; in South Korea by Haksan Publishing; in Italy by Panini Comics; in Spain by Planeta DeAgostini; in Thailand by Vibulkij Publishing; in Indonesia by Elex Media Komputindo; and in Argentina by Editorial Ivrea.

A spin-off manga focusing on Seishiro Nagi, titled Blue Lock: Episode Nagi, began serialization in Kodansha's Bessatsu Shōnen Magazine on June 9, 2022. The spin-off is written and illustrated by Kōta Sannomiya. The spin-off has been collected in a single tankōbon volume as of October 17, 2022.

Volume list

Episode Nagi

Anime
An anime television series adaptation was announced on August 12, 2021. The series is produced by Eight Bit and directed by Tetsuaki Watanabe, with Shunsuke Ishikawa serving as assistant director, Taku Kishimoto overseeing the series' scripts, Masaru Shindō providing the main character designs and serving as chief animation director, Hisashi Tojima serving as chief action director, and Jun Murayama composing the music. It will run for 24 episodes. The series premiered on October 9, 2022, on TV Asahi's  block. The second opening theme song is "Judgement" by Ash Da Hero, while the second ending theme song is "Numbness like a ginger" by Unison Square Garden. Crunchyroll has licensed the series, and have streamed an English dub starting on October 22, 2022. Medialink licensed the series in Asia-Pacific; it is streamed on their Ani-One YouTube channel, and on iQIYI, bilibili, Netflix, and Animax Asia.

Episode list

Stage play
A stage play adaptation of the manga was announced by Kodansha in December 2022. It will run at Osaka's Sankei Hall Breeze from May 4–7, and at Tokyo's Sunshine Theater from May 11–14, 2023. The play will be directed and written by Naohiro Ise. The cast includes Ryōhei Takenaka as Yoichi Isagi, Nobunaga Satō as Meguru Bachira, Shōta Matsuda as Rensuke Kunigami, and Ryō Saeki as Hyōma Chigiri.

Reception
By August 2020, the manga had over 1.9 million copies in circulation; by January 2021, it had over 3 million copies in circulation. over 4 million copies in circulation by April 2021; by August 2021, it had over 5 million in circulation; over 6 million copies in circulation by February 2022; over 8.3 million copies in circulation by March 2022; over 9.3 million copies in circulation by June 2022; over 10 million copies in circulation August 2022; over 16 million copies in circulation by December 2022; over 18 million copies in circulation by January 2023; over 21.5 million copies in circulation by February 2023; and over 24 million copies in circulation by March 2023.

The series was recommended by manga author Hajime Isayama of Attack on Titan fame, for whom Yusuke Nomura previously worked as an assistant. Blue Lock was one of the Top 3 Sports Manga Series of the "Nationwide Bookstore Employees' Recommended Comics of 2020" by Honya Club. Blue Lock won the 45th Kodansha Manga Award in the shōnen category in 2021. The series was nominated for a Harvey Award in the Best Manga category in 2022.

Rebecca Silverman of Anime News Network, in her review of the series' first two volumes, called the "dystopian sports" concept something that makes it stand out among other sports series, but she said that it is so "blatantly absurd that it doesn't entirely work". Silverman praised its art, noting Tite Kubo's overtones, and concluded that while the first two volumes are not perfect, there is enough going to make her want to read more.

Notes

References

External links
 
 

2018 manga
2022 anime television series debuts
Anime series based on manga
Association football in anime and manga
Crunchyroll anime
Eight Bit (studio)
Kodansha manga
Medialink
NUManimation
Shōnen manga
Thriller anime and manga
Winner of Kodansha Manga Award (Shōnen)